The Reverend Dr. Charles Douglas (C.D.) Martin (November 7, 1873 - March 1942) was a West Indian Moravian minister. He was born in St. Kitts, British West Indies to parents Joseph and Adriana Martin. He founded the Fourth Moravian Church in Harlem, New York in 1903. It was located at 124 West 136th Street, Manhattan. He called the church "Beth-Tphillah" which is Hebrew for House of Prayer. In 1912, he was ordained as the first and only Black minister of the Moravian Church in the United States. He presided over the church from July 1908 until his death in March 1942.

The church merged with the Third Moravian Church in January 1968 to become the United Moravian Church.

Negro Silent Protest Parade 

Rev. Dr. Martin was active in, and an activist for, the black community that his church served. In 1917, for the NAACP's historic Negro Silent Protest Parade, he worked with the Reverend Hutchens C. Bishop as Secretary and President, respectively. The gathering of thousands of Negroes, marching in silent protest, on a hot July day, made national news and set the model for other protests to follow.

Dr. Martin penned the call to action encouraging "people of African descent" to join together for the parade. During the parade, Black Boy Scouts passed out flyers to onlookers, white and black alike. In the wake of recent atrocities such as occurred in Waco, Memphis, East St. Louis and with the U.S. occupation in Haiti in mind, he wrote in part, describing "Why We March":

References 

1873 births
1942 deaths
African-American history in New York City
African-American history between emancipation and the civil rights movement
American human rights activists
American humanitarians
Clergy from New York City
Moravian Church missionaries
NAACP activists
Historians from New York (state)
Historians from Maryland